Dirk Mädrich (born 16 July 1983) is a German professional basketball player who currently plays for EWE Baskets Oldenburg of the German Basketball League (Basketball Bundesliga).

References

External links
 Eurocup Profile
 German BBL Profile
 Eurobasket.com Profile

1983 births
Living people
Basketball Löwen Braunschweig players
Centers (basketball)
EWE Baskets Oldenburg players
Forwards (basketball)
German men's basketball players
People from Moers
Sportspeople from Düsseldorf (region)
Telekom Baskets Bonn players